Kenton is a suburb and electoral ward in the north west of Newcastle upon Tyne, England. It borders the Town Moor  and Gosforth. Kenton also has close road links to Newcastle Airport. The ward population at the 2011 Census was 11,605.

The area borders Kingston Park, notable for the Kingston Park shopping centre, as well as Kenton School, one of the largest schools in the UK with approximately 2000 students.

The nearest Tyne and Wear Metro station is Fawdon, with stations at Kingston Park and Bank Foot the other side of the A1 Western bypass. Nearby places include Fawdon and Cowgate.

Residential

Kenton contains a wide range of residential areas and developments. These residential areas range from Council housing estates to modern middle class new-builds and privately owned residential estates. In North Kenton and Kenton Bar, the housing is predominantly council owned. Kenton Lane, which runs through the heart of Kenton, contains traditional 1930s housing on both sides of the road, with more affluent households lining the streets behind.

Places of interest

Kenton contains a wide range of amenities and services for the local community, although some of these amenities are considered to be in Kingston Park and/or bordering Gosforth.

Kenton borders Kingston Park, home to the flagship Tesco Extra store, and has a smaller Tesco Express on Kenton Lane.

North Kenton hosts a shoppings centre locally known as Kenton Retail. The Shopping Centre dates back to 1950's as it was built with the grown demand of houses. The centre is part of an ongoing renovation project that started late 2014, where it has been transformed into a refreshed centre. The centre includes a number of Stores such as Spar, Boots, Premier Local, Post Office, Greggs and Subway. It also includes a Male Barber Shops and Female Salon and a number of different takeaways.

The shopping centre shares a car park with the Kenton Centre.
The Kenton Centre is located on Hillsview Avenue also includes a GP surgery, library, housing office and a social services team.

Kenton Dene is a large green space between Kenton, Montague and Cowgate that exists to the side of Kenton Lane. It has been host to many local events and festivals and is a popular area for dog walkers and walkers alike. Kenton Riding School is situated next to Kenton Dene. The dene also leads onto part of the Newcastle Moor.

Popular pubs in Kenton include the Duke of Wellington and Kenton Social Club

History 
Possibly the first Kenton streets, Shiney Row & Low Row, were built for Kenton Colliery which was situated in what is now Montagu Estate. The colliery was the supply point for Kitty's Drift, a 3-mile underground railway tunnel used for transporting coal to the Bells Close staiths on the Tyne near Scotswood.

Local representation 
Kenton is currently represented locally by Three Conservative City Councillors; Ged Bell, Stephen Lambert and Anya Durrant (Missing in the Ward Since 2019). Nationally, Kenton is incorporated into the Newcastle upon Tyne Central constituency which is represented by Chi Onwurah.

Schools

Kenton has four primary schools, as follows.
 Mountfield Primary
 St Cuthbert's Roman Catholic Primary
 Wyndham Primary
 Kenton Bar Primary
Secondary education and Sixth Form is provided by Kenton School.

References

External links
 Newcastle Council Ward Info: Kenton
 Kenton Technology College and School
 North Kenton Tenants and Residents Assiocation
 Kenton Retail

Districts of Newcastle upon Tyne
Wards of Newcastle upon Tyne